The 2006 Wokingham District Council election took place on 4 May 2006 to elect members of Wokingham Unitary Council in Berkshire, England. One third of the council was up for election and the Conservative Party stayed in overall control of the council.

After the election, the composition of the council was:
Conservative 41
Liberal Democrat 13

Campaign
The election saw the United Kingdom Independence Party put forward a candidate in all of the 18 wards which were being contested. This was the first time they had done this and meant they put forward more candidates than Labour who contested 16 of the wards.

During the campaign the Liberal Democrat leader on the council, Coling Lawley, received death threats, which led the police launch an investigation.

Election result
The results saw the Conservatives strengthen their control of the council after gaining three seats from the Liberal Democrats. The gains came in Coronation, Loddon and Hillside wards with one of the defeated Liberal Democrats being their leader Coling Lawley who lost by 472 votes in Coronation ward. Overall turnout in the election was 39.8%.

Ward results

References

2006 English local elections
2006
2000s in Berkshire